The Marvin Tavern, also known as Matthew Marvin House, is a historic house located at 405 Danbury Road in Wilton, Connecticut, Located adjacent to Wilton High School.  It is a -story wood-frame structure, with a hip roof and a large central chimney.  Although it was built c. 1760, its most prominent feature is its porch, added c. 1880, which features turned posts, a spindled frieze, and decorative jigsawn brackets.  It is also of interest to architectural historians for a number of features, including its flared eaves, which were rare in the region before the 19th century.

The house was listed on the National Register of Historic Places in 1984.

See also
National Register of Historic Places listings in Fairfield County, Connecticut

References

Houses on the National Register of Historic Places in Connecticut
Georgian architecture in Connecticut
Houses completed in 1760
Buildings and structures in Wilton, Connecticut
Houses in Fairfield County, Connecticut
National Register of Historic Places in Fairfield County, Connecticut